William Rawle (April 28, 1759 – April 12, 1836) was an American lawyer in Philadelphia, who in 1791 was appointed as United States district attorney in Pennsylvania. He was a founder and first president of the Historical Society of Pennsylvania, president of the Pennsylvania Abolition Society, and for 40 years a trustee of the University of Pennsylvania.

Early life and education
Rawle was born in Philadelphia, where he studied at the Friends' Academy. His father was Francis Rawle (1729–1761) and mother was Rebecca Warner (1730–1819).

His grandfather was William Rawle (1694–1741) and his great-grandfather was Francis Rawle (1663–1727), who authored some early pamphlets printed by Benjamin Franklin before he started his own business. 
Rawle's family were Cornish American members of the Religious Society of Friends (known as "Quakers"), originating in the parish of St Juliot, Cornwall.

Career
Rawle studied law in New York and at the Middle Temple, London, and was admitted to the bar in 1783. William Rawle founded The Rawle Law Offices in Philadelphia, Pennsylvania in 1783, and this firm has continued to the present day as the oldest law firm in continuous practice in the United States, Rawle & Henderson LLP. In 1791 President Washington appointed him United States district attorney for Pennsylvania, in which capacity he prosecuted the leaders of the Whiskey Insurrection.

He also served as counsel for the First Bank of the United States.  In 1830, Rawle assisted in revising the civil code of Pennsylvania. He took much interest in science, philanthropy, and education, and was active in groups supporting these.  He was a founder and first president of the Historical Society of Pennsylvania, president of the Pennsylvania Abolition Society, a member of the American Philosophical Society, and for forty years served as a trustee of the University of Pennsylvania.

Personal life
In 1783, he was married to Sarah Coates Burge (1761–1824).  Together, they were the parents of twelve children, Elizabeth Margaret, Francis William, Samuel Burge, William, Beulah, Rebecca Shoemaker, Sarah, Francis William, Edward, Henry, Horatio, and Juliet. Their son William Rawle, Jr. (1788–1858), followed his father into the legal profession and married Mary Anna Tilghman, was the daughter of prominent Philadelphia lawyer Edward Tilghman and the granddaughter of Chief Justice Benjamin Chew.

Rawle died on April 12, 1836, in Philadelphia, Pennsylvania.

In 1844, his 27-acre estate in Philadelphia was purchased by Laurel Hill Cemetery and used as an extension of the cemetery originally named South Laurel Hill.

Descendants
Through his son William, he was the grandfather of attorney William Henry Rawle (1823–1889), who married Mary Binney Cadwalader (1829–1861), whose father was the U.S. Representative and Judge John Cadwalader.  Their daughter, novelist Mary Cadwalader Rawle (1850–1923), was married to Frederic Rhinelander Jones, the brother of the novelist Edith (Jones) Wharton, and their daughter was renowned landscape architect Beatrix Farrand (1872–1959).

Published works
 Vindication of Rev. Mr. Heckewelder's 'History of the Indian Nations''' (1818)
 A View of the Constitution of the United States (1825; second edition, 1829)
 Discourse on the Nature and Study of the Law'' (1832)
 "An Address before the Philadelphia Society for Promoting Agriculture" (1819)
 "Two Addresses to the Associated Members of the Bar of Philadelphia" (1824)
 "The Study of the Law" (1832)
 "Biographical Sketch of Sir William Keith"
 "A Sketch of the Life of Thomas Mifflin"
 "Essay on Angelic Influences"

References

External links
Biography and portrait, University of Pennsylvania
A View of the Constitution of the United States of America (Second Edition), in its entirety (free PDF download)
 

American abolitionists
American legal writers
American people of Cornish descent
United States Attorneys for the District of Pennsylvania
American people of English descent
Lawyers from Philadelphia
1759 births
1836 deaths
University of Pennsylvania people
People of colonial Pennsylvania
Members of the American Philosophical Society
19th-century American lawyers